The Biology of the Cell Surface is a book by American biologist Ernest Everett Just. It was published by P. Blakiston’s Son & Co in 1939.

Just began writing the book in 1934 in Naples and finished it in France, shortly before being sent to a prisoner-of-war camp. He considered the book to be his "crowning achievement". The book examined the role of the cell surface in embryology, development and evolution, and presented a critique of gene theory, particularly the views of Jacques Loeb. Sapp suggests that "Just’s theorizing on the cell cortex [in this work] was unsurpassed".

References

External links
The Biology of the Cell Surface - full text
Biodiversity Heritage Library

1939 non-fiction books
1939 in biology
Cell biology
Biology books